Classics: Vol 1, Classics Volume One and similar titles may refer to

Classics: Vol 1, an album by Big Moe
Classics Volume 1, a compilation album of songs by Herb Alpert
 Classics Volume One, a 2013 album by Two Steps From Hell

See also
Classics (disambiguation)